Aldershot is a community in Burlington, Ontario, Canada. Located on the shore of Burlington Bay of Lake Ontario, it is a former unincorporated village that was previously a part of East Flamborough Township until it was annexed by the city of Burlington in 1958.

Transport
Via Rail and GO Transit operate Aldershot railway station, on the Quebec City–Windsor Corridor and Lakeshore West lines respectively, which serves the immediate area and the adjacent city of Hamilton.

See also

 Aldershot High School
 List of unincorporated communities in Ontario

References

External links
Aldershot at Geographical Names of Canada

Neighbourhoods in Burlington, Ontario